The canton of Lesneven is an administrative division of the Finistère department, northwestern France. Its borders were modified at the French canton reorganisation which came into effect in March 2015. Its seat is in Lesneven.

It consists of the following communes:
 
Le Drennec
Le Folgoët
Goulven
Guissény
Kerlouan
Kernilis
Kernouës
Lanarvily
Lesneven
Loc-Brévalaire
Ploudaniel
Plouguerneau
Plouider
Plounéour-Brignogan-Plages
Saint-Frégant
Saint-Méen
Trégarantec

References

Cantons of Finistère